Newtonburg may refer to:

Places
United States
Newtonburg, Pennsylvania, an unincorporated community
Newtonburg, Wisconsin, an unincorporated community